General elections were held in Dominica on 12 June 1995. Although the Dominica Freedom Party received the most votes, the United Workers' Party won 11 of the 21 seats. Voter turnout was 65.2%, the lowest since universal suffrage was introduced in 1951.

Results

References

Dominica
Elections in Dominica
General